Tiberias is a rural locality in the local government area (LGA) of Southern Midlands in the Central LGA region of Tasmania. The 2016 census recorded a population of 5 for the state suburb of Tiberias.

History 
Tiberias was gazetted as a locality in 1974.

Geography
The boundaries of the locality consist of survey lines and the western, northern and eastern shores of Lake Tiberias. The North-South Railway Line passes through the east of the locality.

Road infrastructure 
Route C313 (Rhyndaston Road) passes to the east. From there, Tiberias Road provides access to the locality.

References

Towns in Tasmania
Localities of Southern Midlands Council